Mandala: The UFO Incident (Previously: Mysore Masala) is an upcoming science fiction action film directed by Ajay Sarpeshkar. The film stars Anant Nag, Prakash Belawadi, Sharmiela Mandre, Samyukta Hornad, Kiran Srinivas with support from Sudha Belawadi, Dimpy Fadhya, Neenasam Ashwath, Mandeep Rai, Spoorthi Gumaste, Naresh Narasimhan, Kiran Naik and Samanvita Shetty. The film explores science fiction in an Indian context touching upon heritage and its conservation.

Cast
 Anant Nag
 Prakash Belawadi
 Sharmiela Mandre
 Samyukta Hornad
 Kiran Srinivas
 Sudha Belawadi
 Dimpy Fadhya 
 Neenasam Ashwath
 Mandeep Rai
 Spoorthi Gumaste
 Naresh Narasimhan
 Kiran Naik 
 Samanvita Shetty

Production 
The film, initially titled Mysore Masala, was later renamed to Mandala. Anant Nag, the veteran actor of India known for his contributions to the Kannada film industry, was signed on to play a crucial role of an eccentric journalist. Prakash Belawadi plays the role of Dr. Satyaprakash, the head of a space research agency. Sharmiela Mandre, Samyukta Hornad and Kiran Srinivas play roles that are urban and savvy. Production management was handled by Cinematrix, a Bangalore based company headed by Pradeep Belawadi.

Post-production 
Post-production efforts are underway in multiple cities. Mumbai for sound design by Nithin Lukose, Los Angeles for music by Jesse Clinton, Singapore for visual effects by Oliver Elvis, supported by CG artefact design by Manojna Bellur and editing by 24Post studio.

The film had a presence at the ComicCon 2018 event at Bengaluru. At the event, the team mentioned having designed and built their own VFX elements such as a spaceship, rocket launch metrics, alien scripts, etc. for the film.

The title of the film was changed to MANDALA. This change was announced on all of the film's social media channels on Jan 9th 2022. The Director/Producer mentions this change reflects what the film has become.

References

External links 
 

UFO-related films
Indian science fiction drama films
Upcoming films
Films shot in Bangalore
Films shot in Mysore
Upcoming Kannada-language films